Johan Willem Albarda (5 June 1877 – 19 April 1957) was a Dutch politician of the defunct Social Democratic Workers' Party (SDAP) and later co-founder of the Labour Party (PvdA) and civil engineer.

Biography
Albarda worked as student researcher at the Delft Polytechnic School from May 1896 until July 1903 and also as editor-in-chief of the student newspaper Studenten-Weekblad from April 1898 until July 1903. Albarda worked as a math teacher from August 1903 until September 1911 in Almelo from August 1903 until February 1905 and in The Hague from February 1905 until November 1911 and as a civil servant for municipality of Amsterdam as director of the Social Service from November 1911 until September 1913. Albarda was elected as a Member of the House of Representatives after the election of 1913, taking office on 16 September 1913. After the Leader of the Social Democratic Workers' Party and parliamentary leader of the Social Democratic Workers' Party in the House of Representatives Pieter Jelles Troelstra announced his retirement from national politics and that he would not not stand for the election of 1925 Albarda was selected as his successor as leader on 12 July 1925 and became parliamentary leader in the House of Representatives on 15 September 1925.

On 27 July 1939, the fifth Colijn cabinet was dismissed by Queen Wilhelmina and continued to serve in a demissionary capacity until it was replaced by the second De Geer cabinet with Albarda appointed as Minister of Water Management, taking office on 10 August 1939. On 10 May 1940, Nazi Germany invaded the Netherlands and the government fled to London to escape the German occupation. On 14 May 1940 Albarda announced that he was stepping down as party leader in favor of parliamentary leader in the House of Representatives Willem Drees. The second De Geer cabinet fell on 26 August 1940 after a conflict between Queen Wilhelmina and Prime Minister Dirk Jan de Geer and continued to serve in a demissionary capacity until it was replaced by the first Gerbrandy cabinet with Albarda continuing as of Minister of Water Management, taking office on 3 September 1940. The first Gerbrandy cabinet fell on 12 June 1941 after a conflict between Queen Wilhelmina and Minister of Defence Adriaan Dijxhoorn and continued to serve in a demissionary capacity until it was replaced by the second Gerbrandy cabinet with Albarda continuing as of Minister of Water Management, taking office on 27 July 1941. Albarda was appointed as Minister of Finance following the resignation of Max Steenberghe and dual served in both positions, taking office on 17 November 1941. On 9 December 1942 Albarda resigned as Minister of Finance following the appointment of Johannes van den Broek but continued as Minister of Water Management. On 27 January 1945 Prime Minister Pieter Sjoerds Gerbrandy forced Minister of the Interior Jaap Burger to resign following an impromptu remark during a radio address where Burger differentiated between "wrongful" Dutch civilians (foute Nederlanders) and Dutch civilians who made a mistake (Nederlanders die een fout hebben gemaakt) but because Prime Minister Gerbrandy did not discuss this with rest of the cabinet, all the Social Democratic Workers' Party cabinet members announced their resignation and the cabinet continued to serve in a demissionary capacity until it was replaced by the third Gerbrandy cabinet on 23 February 1945.

Following the end of World War II Albarda remained in active politics. In August 1945, he was nominated as a Member of the Council of State, serving from 28 August 1945 until 1 July 1952. The Albardastraat in The Hague is named after him.

Decorations

References

External links

Official
  Ir. J.W. (Willem) Albarda Parlement & Politiek

1877 births
1957 deaths
Commanders of the Order of Orange-Nassau
Delft University of Technology alumni
Academic staff of the Delft University of Technology
Dutch civil engineers
Dutch expatriates in England
Dutch magazine editors
Dutch newspaper editors
Dutch people of World War II
Dutch political party founders
Dutch political writers
Dutch social workers
Grand Officers of the Order of the Crown (Belgium)
Labour Party (Netherlands) politicians
Leaders of the Social Democratic Workers' Party (Netherlands)
Knights of the Order of the Netherlands Lion
Members of the Council of State (Netherlands)
Members of the House of Representatives (Netherlands)
Members of the Provincial Council of South Holland
Ministers of Finance of the Netherlands
Ministers of Transport and Water Management of the Netherlands
Municipal councillors of The Hague
People from Leeuwarden
Social Democratic Workers' Party (Netherlands) politicians
Writers from The Hague
20th-century Dutch civil servants
20th-century Dutch educators
20th-century Dutch engineers
20th-century Dutch male writers
20th-century Dutch politicians